Johannes Böttner (September 3, 1861 – April 28, 1919) was a German horticulturist.  He was born in Greußen, Germany and died in Frankfurt an der Oder. He created new cultivars of roses and vegetables: asparagus, strawberries and rhubarb.

References

Notes

Bibliography 
 Möllers Deutsche Gärtnerzeitung 24 (1910)
 Böttner, Johannes: Tomatenbuch. Frankfurt 1910 .
 Robert Zander: Geschichte des Gärtnertums. Stuttgart 1952
 Gröning, Gert ; Wolschke-Bulmahn, Joachim: Grüne Biographien. Berlin [u.a.], 1997
 Wimmer, Clemens Alexander: Johannes Böttner, in: Gartenkultur in Brandenburg und Berlin. Potsdam 2000,
 Gerber, Theophil: Persönlichkeiten aus Land- und Forstwirtschaft, Gartenbau und Veterinärmedizin Bd. 1. Berlin 2004, S. 82
 Estate in the Brandenburgisches Landeshauptarchiv in Potsdam

External links 
 
 Garten Literatur 

German horticulturists
Rose breeders
German gardeners
1861 births
1919 deaths